Silver City is a ghost town in northwestern Owyhee County, Idaho, United States, that is listed on the National Register of Historic Places (NRHP). At its height in the 1880s, it was a gold and silver mining town with a population of around 2,500 and approximately 75 businesses.

Description
Silver City served as county seat of Owyhee County from 1867 to 1934. Today, the town has about 70 standing buildings, all of which are privately owned. Many of the owners are third- or fourth-generation descendants of the original miners. There are a handful of small businesses, but no gas or service stations. The property is now owned by the federal government, overseen by the Bureau of Land Management. 

Silver City was founded in 1864 soon after silver was discovered at nearby War Eagle Mountain (elev. ). The settlement grew quickly and was soon considered one of the major cities in Idaho Territory. The first daily newspaper and telegraph office in Idaho Territory were established in Silver City. The town was also among the first places in present-day Idaho to receive electric and telephone service.  Along with Idaho City in the Boise Basin, these mining areas accelerated the growth of the capital city of Boise as a staging and supply point.

The placer and quartz vein mines became depleted around the time Idaho became a state in 1890. Due in part to its extremely remote location, Silver City began a slow decline but was never completely abandoned. Small-scale mining continued off and on until World War II; the last mine to be operated all year round in Silver City was the "Potossi," managed by Ned Williams. By the 1940s, there was only one permanent resident, Willie Hawes (1876–1968), who was born in town and was its mayor, police chief, fire chief, postman, etc.

The Idaho Hotel in Silver City was restored and re-opened for tourists in 1972. It relies on the use of propane refrigerators and stoves in order to supply cold drinks and snacks or a complete meal to guests during the summer months. The rooms are fitted with indoor plumbing and furnished with antiques, making it a tourist destination.

Geography

See also
 List of ghost towns in Idaho
 National Register of Historic Places listings in Owyhee County, Idaho

References

External links

 
 Boise State University - library - Catherine Minear Moore
 The Owyhee War - 1868
 Idaho State Historical Society - photos - digital collections  - Owyhee mining district
 Western Mining History.com - photos - Silver City, Idaho 
 Ghost Towns.com - photos - Silver City, Idaho
 Exploring Silver City - blog - photos - 2002-08
 West County Explorers Club.com - blog - Silver City, Idaho - 2010-10
 YouTube.com - video - Silver City at sunset - 2008-09

Geography of Owyhee County, Idaho
Ghost towns in Idaho
Silver City Historic District (Idaho)
Populated places on the National Register of Historic Places in Idaho